Turan Shahr (also Romanized as Tūrān Shahr; also known as Tūrān Shāh) is a village in Howmeh Rural District, in the Central District of Gilan-e Gharb County, Kermanshah Province, Iran. At the 2006 census, its population was 31, in 7 families. The village is populated by Kurds.

References 

Populated places in Gilan-e Gharb County
Kurdish settlements in Kermanshah Province